Rào Cỏ mountain (Vietnamese: Núi Rào Cỏ) is a mountain in Southeast Asia. It is one of the ultra prominent peaks of Southeast Asia. The mountain is 2,286 metres tall and sits on the international border between Laos and Vietnam.

See also
 List of Ultras of Southeast Asia

References

External links
 "Rao Co, Laos/Vietnam" on Peakbagger

Mountains of Laos
Mountains of Vietnam
International mountains of Asia
Laos–Vietnam border